Radio regulation refers to the regulation and licensing of radio in international law, by individual governments, and by municipalities.

International regulation 
The International Telecommunication Union (ITU) is a specialized agency of the United Nations (UN) that is responsible for issues that concern information and communication technologies. ITU Radio Regulations are the set of ITU's regulations governing electromagnetic spectrum from 9 kHz to 275 GHz.

The reasons are that the radio waves spectrum is on the one hand considered to be a limited natural resource, on the other side some radio waves are able to propagate on considerable distances and interfere with radio services abroad.

Government regulation

United States

In the United States, radio is regulated by the Federal Communications Commission (FCC) and the National Telecommunications and Information Administration (NITA).

References

External links

 National and Regional Radio Regulatory Agencies
 European Radiocommunications Office
 Federal Communications Commission (USA)
 IFT (Mexico)
 Ofcom (UK)
 Traficom (Finland)
 Agence Nationale des Fréquences (France)
 Bakom/Ofcom (Switzerland) 
 Bundesnetzagentur (Germany)
 UKE (Poland) 
 KKDI (Indonesia)
 IRRS (India)
 Telecommunications Regulatory Authority (UAE)
 Australian Communications and Media Authority (Australia)